Oxnard Sessions, Vol.2 is the seventh solo album by jazz pianist Mike Garson. It was originally released in 1992 and was later re-released in 2008 by Allegro Records as the album Jazzhat.

Track listing

References

External links
 Stereophile review Stereophile album review
 Billboard Entry Track listing and review
 Amazon Review Amazon album review and track listing
 mikegarson.com Official website

Mike Garson albums
1992 albums